Wólka is a diminutive of Wola and  may refer to:

Wólka, Aleksandrów County in Kuyavian-Pomeranian Voivodeship (north-central Poland)
Wólka, Rypin County in Kuyavian-Pomeranian Voivodeship (north-central Poland)
Wólka, Lipno County in Kuyavian-Pomeranian Voivodeship (north-central Poland)
Wólka, Krasnystaw County in Lublin Voivodeship (east Poland)
Wólka, Białystok County in Podlaskie Voivodeship (north-east Poland)
Wólka, Bielsk County in Podlaskie Voivodeship (north-east Poland)
Wólka, Grajewo County in Podlaskie Voivodeship (north-east Poland)
Wólka, Hajnówka County in Podlaskie Voivodeship (north-east Poland)
Wólka, Gmina Sidra in Podlaskie Voivodeship (north-east Poland)
Wólka, Gmina Suchowola in Podlaskie Voivodeship (north-east Poland)
Wólka, Suwałki County in Podlaskie Voivodeship (north-east Poland)
Wólka, Gmina Filipów in Podlaskie Voivodeship (north-east Poland)
Wólka, Gmina Poddębice in Łódź Voivodeship (central Poland)
Wólka, Gmina Wartkowice in Łódź Voivodeship (central Poland)
Wólka, Lublin County in Lublin Voivodeship (east Poland)
Wólka, Łuków County in Lublin Voivodeship (east Poland)
Wólka, Jędrzejów County in Świętokrzyskie Voivodeship (south-central Poland)
Wólka, Końskie County in Świętokrzyskie Voivodeship (south-central Poland)
Wólka, Subcarpathian Voivodeship (south-east Poland)
Wólka, Lipsko County in Masovian Voivodeship (east-central Poland)
Wólka, Płock County in Masovian Voivodeship (east-central Poland)
Wólka, Warsaw West County in Masovian Voivodeship (east-central Poland)
Wólka, Węgrów County in Masovian Voivodeship (east-central Poland)
Wólka, Greater Poland Voivodeship (west-central Poland)
Wólka, Silesian Voivodeship (south Poland)
Wólka, Bartoszyce County in Warmian-Masurian Voivodeship (north Poland)
Wólka, Gołdap County in Warmian-Masurian Voivodeship (north Poland)
Wólka, Kętrzyn County in Warmian-Masurian Voivodeship (north Poland)
Wólka, Olsztyn County in Warmian-Masurian Voivodeship (north Poland)
Wólka, Pisz County in Warmian-Masurian Voivodeship (north Poland)
Wólka, West Pomeranian Voivodeship (north-west Poland)

See also
Wola (disambiguation)
Czech Lhotka (disambiguation)
Slovak Lehôtka (disambiguation)
Eastern Slavic Slobodka (disambiguation), Polonised Słobódka (disambiguation)